Comb binding (sometimes referred to as "cerlox" or "surelox" binding) is one of many ways to bind pages together into a book. This method uses round plastic spines with 19 rings (for US Letter size) or 21 rings (for A4 size) and a hole puncher that makes rectangular holes. Comb binding is sometimes referred to as plastic comb binding or spiral comb binding.

Binding process
To bind a document, the user first punches holes in the paper with a specialized hole punch. Pages must be punched a few at a time with most of these machines. If hard covers are desired, they must be punched as well. In bulk applications, a paper drilling machine may be used.

Then the user chooses a spine size that will match the document. Spine lengths are generally  to match the length of letter-size paper.

The rings on the spine open and insert into the holes in the page, then rest against the body of the spine, resulting in a closure that can be opened again for making changes to the book.

Comparison with other punch binds
With this bind, the book lies flat but cannot be opened 360 degrees. For a book that can be opened such that the covers touch, a spine that does not have an obstructive body, such as a coil binding, is a better option.

References
How To Comb Bind
About.com Desktop Publishing article

Bookbinding